Bermet Duvanaeva (born 28 January 1988) is a former tennis player from Kyrgyzstan.

In her career, Duvanaeva won one singles title on the ITF Women's Circuit. On 30 July 2012, she reached her best singles ranking of world No. 449. On 13 September 2010, she peaked at No. 820 in the doubles rankings.

Playing for Kyrgyzstan at the Fed Cup, Duvanaeva has a win–loss record of 16–8.

ITF Circuit finals

Singles: 3 (1 title, 2 runner-ups)

Fed Cup participation

Singles

Doubles

References

External links
 
 
 

1988 births
Living people
Sportspeople from Bishkek
Kyrgyzstani female tennis players
Tennis players at the 2006 Asian Games
Tennis players at the 2010 Asian Games
Asian Games competitors for Kyrgyzstan